Melaleuca fissurata is a plant in the myrtle family, Myrtaceae and is endemic to the south-west of  Western Australia. It is a shrub with rough bark, dished leaves and heads of white or yellow flowers in spring. It is closely related to Melaleuca lateriflora but differs from it in having roughly textured, corky fruit and shorter, convex shaped leaves.

Description
In cross section the leaves are concave or dished.

The white or yellow flowers are arranged in heads on the sides of the branches. The stamens are arranged in five bundles around the flower, each bundle containing 10 to 16 stamens.

Taxonomy and naming
Melaleuca fissurata was first formally described in 1986 by Bryan Barlow in Nuytsia. The specific epithet (fissurata) is from the Latin fissura meaning "crack" or "cleft", referring to the cracked surface of the fruit.

Distribution and habitat
Melaleuca fissurata is found between the Hyden and Scaddan districts in the Mallee biogeographic region. It grows in sand and sandy loam on samphire flats and salt pans.

Conservation status
This species is classified "Priority Four" by the Government of Western Australia Department of Parks and Wildlife meaning that it is "rare, threatened or ... in need of monitoring". It is included in the IUCN red list of threatened plants, classified as "rare".

References

fissurata
Myrtales of Australia
Plants described in 1986
Endemic flora of Western Australia